Gymnopilus viscidus is a species of mushroom in the family Hymenogastraceae. It was given its current name by American mycologist Murrill in 1917.

See also

List of Gymnopilus species

References

External links
Gymnopilus viscidus at Index Fungorum

viscidus
Taxa named by Charles Horton Peck